The Volvo Engine Architecture (VEA) is a family of straight-three and straight-four automobile petrol and diesel engines produced by Volvo Cars in Skövde, Sweden, since 2013, Zhangjiakou, China since 2016 and Tanjung Malim, Malaysia since 2022 by Proton. Volvo markets all engines under the Drive–E designation, while Geely groups the three-cylinder variants with its other engines under the G-power name. These engines are some of the few ever put into production as twincharged engines, in the company of the Lancia Delta Integrale and concept Jaguar CX-75.

History
Development of the new engine family began in 2006, with the decision to only produce four-cylinder engines being finalised in 2007. The intention was to produce smaller, more economical and environmentally friendly engines that would be fitted to every Volvo model. In 2008 Volvo began to upgrade its Skövde engine plant and invested roughly 2 billion SEK into development and tooling for the VEA.

In the autumn of 2013, the first cars with the new engines were delivered to customers, starting with the S60 II and V60 models. At the same time, Volvo began to phase out the five-cylinder petrol and diesel engines, the six-cylinder petrol engines as well as any four-cylinder engines from other manufacturers. Until the end of 2015, nearly all other engines had been phased out, with only a few non VEA engines remaining in production for select models. Volvo nearly completed the phaseout in 2016 with only two variants of the five-cylinder diesel remaining in production for the 60-series models.

In December 2014, Volvo introduced the first hybrid variant of a VEA engine with the launch of the XC90 T8. It uses an electric rear axle drive (ERAD) for both electric propulsion and AWD capabilities. Hybrid engines are equipped with a crankshaft integrated starter generator (CISG) that is used to start the engine, capture otherwise lost energy when slowing down and reduce lag at low rpm by acting as an additional supercharger. Volvo refers to this type of hybrid implementation as Twin Engine.

With the introduction of Volvo's new flagship sedan in 2016, the S90, the PowerPulse anti-lag system for the top of the range diesel engines was unveiled. It uses a small tank of compressed air that can instantaneously be released into the turbocharger to help with spool up, thereby reducing turbo lag.

Volvo began testing of three-cylinder variants in mid 2014, it had been planned to introduce these engines in 2015. With their smaller capacity and less power they were meant to be used as base engines. In 2015 no three-cylinder engines were released, instead four-cylinder variants with 1.5 L capacity were introduced as base engines on some models. In the second half of 2017, the first production VEA three-cylinder engine was released with the debut of the LEVC TX, where it is used as a range extender. The first Volvo three-cylinder VEA was slated for introduction in 2018 for the XC40 under the T3 engine designation, however it saw only limited release.

Due to stricter emissions laws, additional and improved emissions control equipment was introduced, beginning in the second half of 2017 for the 2018 model year. Diesel engines gained a SCR-catalyst to decrease NOx emissions, petrol engines received a particle filter. These changes are referred to as VEA GEN2. This improved the emissions rating to Euro 6c and for some engines to Euro 6d-TEMP. The improvements were rolled out in stages and some engines, particularly the hybrid variants, remained in Euro 6 configuration until the second quarter of 2018. By model year 2019 all engines had been updated to achieve Euro 6d-TEMP certification, with some engines getting discontinued. All diesel engines are now equipped with Ad-Blue and all petrol engines with a particle filter.

Volvo has been developing a major update for all its engines since 2017. It is code-named VEA GEN3 (with VEP GEN3 and VED GEN3 respectively) and part of Volvo's effort to hybridize all of its engines. The MHEV variants will have a 48V network separate from the high-voltage battery system.

New B badging for hybrid vehicles. Deviating from the previously introduced T<some number> (1994 with the T-5, without the dash in 1996 for X70) and D<some number> (2002 with the D5 engine, expanded in ~2009 with D4 and D3 subdivision) naming/badging scheme. The system uses kinetic energy recovery via a belt driven integrated starter generator (BISG) which is stored in a 48V 0.25 kWh lion battery. Under heavy load or rapid acceleration the BISG is used as a power adder. P0 hybridization.

Nomenclature
The engine codes consist of a series of letters and digits. The actual, broadly used engine code is 7 or 8 characters long. Hybrid models can have a second engine code that is 7 characters long, mild hybrids engine codes are 6 characters long. Different, more general engine codes are used for some certification and approval documents and are 6 to 8 characters long. An additional 2 characters are used to identify each specific engine variant with an MP or HP suffix to differentiate performance.

Standard engine codes:
 1st: Fuel type (B/D) B = Bensin (Petrol), D = Diesel
 2nd: Number of cylinders (3/4)
 3rd & 4th: Approximate displacement in deciliters, may be rounded up or down (19 ~= 2.0 L)
 5th: Valves per cylinder (4)
 6th: Induction method (T) T = turbocharged
 7th & 8th: Engine variant (4/5/6/9/11/14/20/23/27/35/44)

Petrol (GEP3/VEP4)

1.5

All engines are turbocharged and intercooled with direct injection. All engines are equipped with an electric water pump, but no balancer shafts.

B3154T

The B3154T is usually only referred to as range extender. When running it only recharges the high voltage battery, thus functioning as a range extender giving approx. 300 miles of additional range. Single turbocharger.

CISG.

Emissions level Euro 6. 

Applications:
 2017–present LEVC TX badged as LEVC TX, LEVC TX e-City or with no additional badging

B3154T

Engine variant for cars equipped with a manual or automatic gearbox. Single turbocharger.

This engine is only available with a six-gear gearbox made by Volvo Cars or the Toyota AW8G30 gearbox.

It was replaced by the newer engine B3154T7 which retains the same ID code of 11 but not 14; automatic was changed to B3154T2 which retains the same ID code of 15.

Emissions level Euro 6d-TEMP.

Applications: 
 2019 Volvo XC40 badged as XC40 T3

B3154T2 

Engine variant for cars equipped with an automatic gearbox. Single turbocharger.

This engine is only available with the AW8G30 gearbox. 

Emissions level Euro 6d-TEMP.

Applications: 
 2020–present Volvo XC40 badged as XC40 T3

B3154T3

Emissions level euro 6dtemp.

Applications: 
 2019–present Volvo XC40 badged as XC40 T2

B3154T5

Single turbocharger.

This engine is only available with the 7DCTH gearbox.

Emissions level Euro 6d.

Applications: 
 2020–present Volvo XC40 badged as XC40 T5 Twin Engine

B3154T7 

Engine variant for cars equipped with a manual gearbox. Single turbocharger.

This engine is only available with the M76 R6.2 gearbox.

Emissions level Euro 6d-TEMP.

Applications: 
 2020–present Volvo XC40 badged as XC40 T3

B3154T9

Single turbocharger.

Emissions level Euro 6d-TEMP.

Applications: 
 2020–present Volvo XC40 badged as XC40 T2

JLH-3G15TD

Single turbocharger.

This engine is only available with a 7-speed DCT.

No emissions standard information.

Applications:
 2016-present Geely Boyue
 2018-present Geely Binyue
 2018-present Geely Borui GE
 2020-present Geely Icon
 2018–present Lynk & Co 01 / 领克01 badged as 01 PHEV
 2018–present Lynk & Co 02 / 领克02 badged as 02 or 02 1.5TD
 2018–present Lynk & Co 03 / 领克03 badged as 03 or 03 1.5TD
 2020–present Proton X50 (Malaysia) 
 2020–present Proton X70 (Malaysia, Pakistani and Bangladesh market)

JLH-3G15TDC

Single turbocharger.

Emissions level China V.

Applications:
 2018–present Lynk & Co 02 / 领克02 badged as 02 or 02 1.5TD

B4154T2

Engine variant for cars equipped with an automatic gearbox. Single turbocharger.

This engine is only available with an automatic gearbox.

Emissions level Euro 6d-TEMP.

Applications: 
 2019 Volvo V40 II badged as V40 T3
 2019 Volvo V40CC badged as V40CC T3

B4154T3

Engine variant for cars equipped with an automatic gearbox. Single turbocharger.

Emissions level Euro 6d-TEMP.

Applications: 
 2019 Volvo V40 II badged as V40 T2

B4154T4

Engine variant for cars equipped with an automatic gearbox. Single turbocharger.

This engine is only available with the AW TF-71SC gearbox.

Emissions level Euro 6b.

Applications:
 2016–2018 Volvo V40 II badged as V40 T3
 2015–2018 Volvo V40CC badged as V40CC T3
 2016–2018 Volvo S60 II badged as S60 T3
 2016–2018 Volvo S60L badged as S60L T3
 2016–2018 Volvo V60 badged as V60 T3

B4154T5

Engine variant for cars equipped with an automatic gearbox. Single turbocharger.

This engine is only available with the AW TF-71SC gearbox.

Emissions level Euro 6b, upgraded to Euro 6d-TEMP with model year 2018.

Applications:
 2016–2019 Volvo V40 II badged as V40 T2
 2016–2018 Volvo S60 II badged as S60 T2
 2016–2018 Volvo V60 badged as V60 T2

B4154T6

Single turbocharger.

This engine is only available with the AW TF-71SC gearbox.

Emissions level Euro 6b.

Applications:
 2016–2019 Volvo V40 II badged as V40 T3
 2016–2018 Volvo S60 II badged as S60 T3
 2016–2018 Volvo V60 badged as V60 T3

2.0
All engines are turbocharged and intercooled with direct injection. More powerful versions are equipped with a roots type supercharger in addition to being turbocharged and intercooled.
All engines come with an electric water pump and balancer shafts.

B4204T5

Single turbocharger.

This engine is only available with the 7DCT gearbox.

Emissions level Euro 6d-TEMP.

Applications: 
 2020–present Volvo XC40 badged as XC40 Twin Engine or XC40 T5 Twin Engine

JLH-4G20TD

Single turbocharger.

Emissions level China VI.

Applications:
 2018–present Lynk & Co 02 / 领克02 badged as 02 or 02 2.0T or 02 AWD

JLH-4G20TDB

Emissions level China VIB.

Applications:
 2020–present Geely Xingyue / Geely Xing Yue / 吉利星越 badged as 驭星者AWD or 星越 350T

B4204T9

Turbocharger and supercharger.

This engine is only available with the AW TG-81SC gearbox.

Emissions level Euro 6, beginning with model year 2018 emissions level Euro 6b.

Applications:
 2015–2018 Volvo S60 II badged as S60 T6 or S60 T6 AWD
 2015–2018 Volvo V60 badged as V60 T6 or V60 T6 AWD
 2014–2017 Volvo XC60 badged as XC60 T6 or XC60 T6 AWD

B4204T10

Turbocharger and supercharger.

This engine is only available with the AW TG-81SC gearbox.

Emissions level Euro 6b.

Applications:
 2014–2018 Volvo S60 II badged as S60 T6
 2014–2017 Volvo XC60 badged as XC60 T6

B4204T11

The compression ratio was changed to 10.8:1. Single turbocharger.

This engine is only available with the AW TG-81SC gearbox.

A specially designed ULEV2 emissions variant of this engine exists.

Emissions level Euro 6.

Applications:
 2015–2019 Volvo V40 II badged as V40 T5
 2015–2019 Volvo V40CC badged as V40CC T5 or V40CC T5 AWD
 2015–2018 Volvo S60 II badged as S60 T5
 2015–2018 Volvo S60L badged as S60L T5 or S60L T5 AWD
 2015–2018 Volvo S60CC badged as S60CC T5 AWD
 2015–2018 Volvo V60 badged as V60 T5
 2015–2018 Volvo V60CC badged as V60CC T5 or V60CC T5 AWD
 2015–2017 Volvo XC60 badged as XC60 T5 or XC60 T5 AWD
 2014–2016 Volvo S80 II badged as S80 T5
 2014–2016 Volvo V70 III badged as V70 T5 or V70 Bi-Fuel
 2014–2016 Volvo XC70 II badged as XC70 T5

B4204T12

Single turbocharger.

This engine is a PZEV emissions variant and features additional emissions reducing equipment.

Applications:
 2015–2018 Volvo S60 II badged as S60 T5
 2015–2017 Volvo XC60 badged as XC60 T5

B4204T14

The compression ratio was changed to 10.8:1. Single turbocharger.

The engine is equipped with a particle filter. Emissions level Euro 6d-TEMP.

Applications: 
 2018–present Volvo XC40 badged as XC40 T5 AWD

B4204T15

The compression ration was changed to 10.8:1. Single turbocharger.

This engine is only available with the AW TG-81SC gearbox.

Emissions level Euro 6.

Applications:
 2014–2016 Volvo V40 II badged as V40 T5
 2015–2016 Volvo V40CC badged as V40CC T5
 2016–2017 Volvo S60 II badged as S60 T5
 2016–2017 Volvo V60 badged as V60 T5
 2014–2016 Volvo S80 II badged as S80 T5

B4204T17

The compression ratio was changed to 11.3:1. Single turbocharger.

This engine is only available with the M76 R6.2 gearbox.

Emissions level Euro 6d-TEMP.

Applications:
 2018–2019 Volvo V40 II badged as V40 T2

B4204T18

Single turbocharger.

Gearbox only TG-80SC AWD

Emissions level Euro 6d-TEMP.

Applications: 
 2018–present Volvo XC40 badged as XC40 T5 AWD
 2021–present Lynk & Co 09 Mild hybrid 2.0T+8AT 48V mechanical four-wheel drive
 2021–present Lynk & Co 09 Hybrid 2.0T HEV light hybrid electric four-wheel drive

B4204T19

The compression ratio was changed to 11.3:1. Single turbocharger.

This engine is available with the M66H, M76, AW TF81-SC and AW TF-71SC gearbox.

Emissions level Euro 6, beginning with model year 2018 emissions level Euro 6b.

Applications:
 2016–2019 Volvo V40 II badged as V40 T4
 2016–2019 Volvo V40CC badged as V40CC T4
 2016–2018 Volvo S60 II badged as S60 T4
 2016–2018 Volvo S60L badged as S60L T4
 2016–2018 Volvo V60 badged as V60 T4
 2015–2016 Volvo V70 III badged as V70 T4

B4204T20

Single turbocharger.

Emissions level Euro 6, for the XC60 II emissions level Euro 6b.

Applications:
 2017–present Volvo XC60 II badged as XC60 T5 AWD
 2016–present Volvo S90 II badged as S90 T5
 2017–present Volvo V90CC badged as V90CC T5 AWD
 2016–present Volvo XC90 II badged as XC90 T5 AWD
2019–present Volvo S60 III badged as S60 T5 AWD

B4204T21

Single turbocharger.

This engine is only available with the AW TG-81SC gearbox.

Emissions level Euro 6.

Applications:
 2015–2019 Volvo V40CC badged as V40CC T4 AWD

B4204T23

Single turbocharger.

In Europe emissions level Euro 6, for the XC60 II emissions level Euro 6b. 
In China emissions level China VI.

Applications: 
 2019–present Volvo S60 III badged as S60 T5 AWD
 2019–present Volvo V60CC badged as V60CC T5 or V60CC T5 AWD
 2017–present Volvo XC60 II badged as XC60 T5 AWD
 2016–present Volvo S90 II badged as S90 T5
 2016–present Volvo S90L badged as S90长轴距 T5
 2017–present Volvo V90 II badged as V90 T5 or V90 Bi-Fuel
 2017–present Volvo V90CC badged as V90CC T5 AWD
 2015–present Volvo XC90 II badged as XC90 T5 AWD

 2019–present Lynk & Co 03 / 领克03 badged as 03+

B4204T26

The compression ratio was changed to 11.8:1. Single turbocharger. 

This engine is only available with the AW TG-81SC gearbox.

Emissions level Euro 6, during model year 2018 upgraded to emissions level Euro 6d-TEMP.

Applications: 
 2019–present Volvo S60 III badged as S60 T5 or S60 T5 AWD
 2019–present Volvo V60 II badged as V60 T5 or V60 T5 AWD
 2018–present Volvo XC60 II badged as XC60 T5 or XC60 T5 AWD
 2018–present Volvo S90 II badged as S90 T5
 2018–present Volvo V90 II badged as V90 T5
 2018–present Volvo V90CC badged as V90CC T5 AWD
 2018–present Volvo XC90 II badged as XC90 T5 AWD

B4204T27

Turbocharger and supercharger.

Emissions level Euro 6, upgraded to Euro 6b for model year 2017, beginning with model year 2018 emissions level Euro 6d-TEMP.

Applications: 
 2019–present Volvo S60 III badged as S60 T6 AWD
 2019–present Volvo V60 II badged as V60 T6 AWD
 2017–present Volvo XC60 II badged as XC60 T6 AWD
 2017–present Volvo S90 II badged as S90 T6 AWD
 2017–present Volvo V90 II badged as V90 T6 AWD
 2017–present Volvo V90CC badged as V90CC T6 AWD
 2016–present Volvo XC90 II badged as XC90 T6 AWD
 2021–present Volvo XC90 II badged as XC90 B6 AWD
 2021–present Volvo XC60 II badged as XC60 B6 AWD

B4204T28

Turbocharger and supercharger.

It was increased to  beginning with model year 2018.

This engine is only available with the AW TG-81SC gearbox.

Emissions level Euro 6b, from model year 2018 emissions level Euro 6d-TEMP.

Applications: 
 2018–present Volvo XC60 II badged as XC60 T8, XC60 T8 AWD, XC60 Twin Engine or XC60 T8 TWIN ENGINE AWD
 2018–present Volvo S90 II badged as S90 T8, S90 T8 AWD, S90 Twin Engine or S90 T8 TWIN ENGINE AWD
 2019–present Volvo V90 II badged as V90 T8, V90 T8 AWD, V90 Twin Engine or V90 T8 TWIN ENGINE AWD
 2016–present Volvo XC90 II badged as XC90 T8, XC90 T8 AWD, XC90 Twin Engine or XC90 T8 TWIN ENGINE AWD

B4204T29

Turbocharger and supercharger.

Turbocharger and supercharger.

This engine is only available with the AW TG-81SC gearbox.

Emissions level Euro 6, from model year 2019 on emissions level Euro 6d-TEMP.

Applications: 
 2019–present Volvo V60 II badged as V60 T6 AWD
 2018–2020 Volvo XC60 II badged as XC60 T6 AWD
 2018–present Volvo S90 II badged as S90 T6 AWD
 2018–present Volvo V90 II badged as V90 T6 AWD
 2018–present Volvo V90CC badged as V90CC T6 AWD
 2018–present Volvo XC90 II badged as XC90 T6 AWD

B4204T30

Single turbocharger.

This engine is available with a 7-speed DCT.

Emissions level China VI.

Applications:
 2017–present Lynk & Co 01 / 领克01 badged as 01 AWD
 2018–present Lynk & Co 02 / 领克02 badged as 02, 02 2.0T or 02 AWD.

B4204T31

The compression ratio was changed to 11.8:1. Single turbocharger. 

This engine is only available with the AW TG-81SC gearbox.

Emissions level Euro 6, beginning with model year 2018 emissions level Euro 6d-TEMP.

Applications: 
 2018–present Volvo S90 II badged as S90 T4
 2018–present Volvo V90 II badged as V90 T4

B4204T32

Turbocharger and supercharger.

This engine is only available with the AW TG-81SC gearbox.

Emissions level China V.

Applications: 
 2016–2019 Volvo S60L badged as S60L T6 Twin Engine

B4204T33

Single turbocharger.

This engine is only available with the M76 manual transmission.

Emissions level Euro 6d-TEMP.

Applications: 
 2019 Volvo V40 II badged as V40 T3

B4204T34

Turbocharger and supercharger.

Turbocharger and supercharger.

This engine is only available with the AW TG-81SD gearbox.

Emissions level Euro 6d-TEMP.

Applications: 
 2019–present Volvo S60 III badged as S60 T8 Twin Engine
 2019–present Volvo V60 II badged as V60 T8 Twin Engine, V60 T8 Twin Engine AWD or V60 T8 Twin Engine eAWD
 2018–present Volvo XC60 II badged as XC60 T8, XC60 T8 TWIN ENGINE eAWD or XC60 T8 AWD RECHARGE
 2018–present Volvo S90 II badged as S90L T8, S90 Excellence or S90L Excellence
 2018–present Volvo XC90 II badged as XC90 T8 or XC90 T8 TWIN ENGINE

B4204T35

Turbocharger and supercharger. 

This engine is only available with the AW TG-81SC gearbox.

In Europe emissions level Euro 6, upgraded to emissions level Euro 6b, from model year 2018 on Euro 6d-TEMP.
In China emissions level China V, upgraded to China VI.

Applications: 
 2020–present Volvo V60 II badged as V60 T8, T8 AWD, T8 Twin Engine AWD, T8 Polestar Engineered 
 2018–present Volvo XC60 II badged as XC60 T8, XC60 T8 AWD, XC60 Twin Engine or XC60 T8 TWIN ENGINE AWD
 2018–present Volvo S90 II badged as S90 T8, S90 T8 AWD, S90 Twin Engine or S90 T8 TWIN ENGINE AWD or S90 RECHARGE T8
 2018–present Volvo V90 II badged as V90 T8, V90 T8 AWD, V90 Twin Engine or V90 T8 TWIN ENGINE AWD
 2016–present Volvo XC90 II badged as XC90 T8, XC90 T8 AWD, XC90 Twin Engine or XC90 T8 TWIN ENGINE AWD
 2021–present Lynk & Co 09 PHEV 2.0T+8AT PHEV electric four-wheel drive

B4204T36

Single turbocharger.

Emissions level Euro 6d-TEMP.

Applications: 
 2018–present Volvo XC40 badged as XC40 T5 AWD

B4204T37

The compression ratio was changed to 11.3:1. Engine variant for cars equipped with a manual gearbox. Single turbocharger.

This engine is only available with the M66H gearbox.

Emissions level Euro 6.

Applications: 
 2016–2018 Volvo V40 II badged as V40 T3
 2016–2018 Volvo V40CC badged as V40CC T3
 2016–2018 Volvo S60 II badged as S60 T3
 2016–2018 Volvo V60 badged as V60 T3

B4204T38

The compression ratio was changed to 11.3:1. Engine variant for cars equipped with a manual gearbox. Single turbocharger.

This engine was only available with the M66H gearbox until model year 2017, afterwards it was only available with the M76 gearbox.

Emissions level Euro 6.

Applications: 
 2016–2019 Volvo V40 II badged as V40 T2

B4204T41

The compression ratio was changed to 8.6:1. Single turbocharger.

Emissions level Euro 6.

Applications: 
 2016–2019 Volvo V40 II badged as V40 T5
 2017–2019 Volvo V40CC badged as V40CC T5 or V40CC T5 AWD
 2016–2018 Volvo S60 II badged as S60 T5
 2016–2018 Volvo V60 badged as V60 T5
 2016–2017 Volvo XC60 badged as XC60 T5

B4204T43

The compression ratio was changed to 8.6:1. Turbocharger and supercharger.

This engine is only available with the AW TG-81SC gearbox.

Emissions level Euro 6.

Applications: 
 2017–2018 Volvo S60 II badged as S60 Polestar
 2017–2018 Volvo V60 badged as V60 Polestar

B4204T44

The compression ratio was changed to 10.8:1. Single turbocharger.

This engine is only available with the gearbox.

Emissions level Euro 6.

Applications: 
 2020–present Volvo V60 II badged as V60 T4'''
 2018–present Volvo XC60 II badged as XC60 T4 2018–present Volvo S90L badged as S90长轴距 T4 2018–present Volvo V90 II badged as V90 T4B4204T45

Turbocharger and supercharger.

This engine is only available with an automatic gearbox.

Emissions level Euro 6d-TEMP.

Applications: 
 2020–present Volvo S60 III badged as S60 T6, S60 T6 AWD or S60 T6 Twin Engine 2019–present Volvo V60 II badged as V60 T8, V60 T8 AWD or V60 T8 Twin Engine 

B4204T46

Turbocharger and supercharger.

This engine is only available with the AW TG-81SD gearbox.

Emissions level Euro 6d-TEMP.

Applications: 
 2020–present Volvo S60 II badged as S60 T6 AWD 2019–present Volvo V60 II badged as V60 T6 Twin Engine, V60 T6 Twin Engine AWD or V60 T6 Twin Engine eAWD 2021–present Volvo XC60 II badged as XC60 Recharge T6 or V60 T6 AWD RechargeB4204T47

The compression ratio was changed to 11.3:1. Single turbocharger.

This engine is only available with the AW TG-81SC gearbox.

Emissions level Euro 6d-TEMP.

Applications: 
 2019–present Volvo XC40 badged as XC40 T4 or XC40 T4 AWDB4204T48

The rear electric motor (ERAD) delivers 87 PS (64 kW; 86 hp) and 240 N⋅m (180 lb⋅ft) of torque. Turbocharger and supercharger.

Battery capacity is 11.6 kWh.

This engine is only available with the AW TG-81SD gearbox.

Emissions level Euro 6d-TEMP.

Applications: 
 2020–present Volvo S60 III badged as S60 Polestar Engineered or S60 T8 Twin Engine Polestar Engineered 2020–present Volvo V60 II badged as V60 Polestar Engineered or V60 T8 Twin Engine Polestar Engineered 2020–present Volvo XC60 II badged as XC60 Polestar Engineered or XC60 T8 Twin Engine Polestar Engineered 2019–present Polestar 1 badged as Polestar 1Diesel (VED4)

2.0
All engines are turbocharged and intercooled, certain variants are twin turbocharged. Some variants additionally are equipped with Variable Nozzle Turbine (VNT) turbochargers. In order to achieve injection pressures of up to 2500 bar all engines are equipped with a belt driven fuel pump. High power variants are equipped with balancer shafts and all variants have a mechanical water pump.

D420T2 / D4204T2

Twin turbochargers.

This engine is only available with the AWF8G55 gearbox.

Emissions level Euro 6d-TEMP.

Applications: 
 2020–present Volvo XC60 II badged as XC60 B5 AWD 2020–present Volvo XC90 II badged as XC90 B5 AWD 

D420T8 / D4204T8

Twin turbochargers.

This engine is only available with the AWF8G55 gearbox.

Emissions level Euro 6d-Temp.

Applications: 
 2020–present Volvo XC60 II badged as XC60 B4 AWDD4204T4

Twin turbochargers.

Emissions level Euro 6, later upgraded to emissions level Euro 6d-TEMP.

Applications: 
 2017–2018 Volvo S60CC badged as S60CC D3 AWD 2016–2018 Volvo V60CC badged as V60CC D3 2016–2018 Volvo XC60 badged as XC60 D3 2019–present Volvo V60 II badged as V60 D3 AWD 2019–present Volvo V60CC II badged as V60CC D3 AWD 2018–present Volvo XC60 II badged as XC60 D3 2017–present Volvo V90 II badged as V90 D3 AWD 2020–present Volvo XC60 II badged as XC60 D4D4204T5

Twin turbochargers.

This engine is available with the M66, AW TF-71SC and AW TG-81SC gearbox.

Emissions level Euro 6.

Applications: 
 2014–2015 Volvo S60 II badged as S60 D4 2014–2015 Volvo V60 badged as V60 D4 2014–2016 Volvo S80 II badged as S80 D4 2014–2016 Volvo V70 III badged as V70 D4 2014–2016 Volvo XC60 badged as XC60 D4 2014–2016 Volvo XC70 II badged as XC70 D4D4204T6

Single turbocharger.

Emissions level Euro 6.

Applications: 
 2016–2018 Volvo XC90 II badged as XC90 D4 AWDD4204T8

The compression ratio was changed to 16.0:1. Single turbocharger.

This engine was available with the M66 gearbox until model year 2017, afterwards it was available with the M76 gearbox. All model years are available with the AW TF-71SC gearbox.

Emissions level Euro 6, upgraded to Euro 6d-TEMP.

Applications: 
 2016–2019 Volvo V40 II badged as V40 D2 2016–2019 Volvo V40CC badged as V40CC D2 2016–2018 Volvo S60 II badged as S60 D2 2016–2018 Volvo V60 badged as V60 D2D4204T9

The compression ratio was changed to 16.0:1. Single turbocharger with VNT.

This engine was available with the M66F gearbox until model year 2017, afterwards it was available with the M76 gearbox. All model years are available with the AW TF-71SC gearbox.

Emissions level Euro 6, upgraded to Euro 6d-TEMP.

Applications: 
 2016–2019 Volvo V40 II badged as V40 D3 2016–2019 Volvo V40CC badged as V40CC D3 2018–present Volvo XC40 badged as XC40 D3 or XC40 D3 AWD 2016–2018 Volvo S60 II badged as S60 D3 2016–2019 Volvo V60 badged as V60 D3 2016 Volvo V70 III badged as V70 D3 2017–2019 Volvo S90 II badged as S90 D3 
 2017–2019 Volvo V90 II badged as V90 D3D4204T11

Twin turbochargers.

This engine is only available with the AW TG-81SC gearbox.

Emissions level Euro 6b.

Applications: 
 2016–2018 Volvo S60 II badged as S60 D5 
 2016–2018 Volvo V60 badged as V60 D5 2016 Volvo XC90 II badged as XC90 D5 AWDD4204T12

Twin turbochargers.

The engine is equipped with a SCR system that has a 14.5 L AdBlue tank.

Emissions level Euro 6d-TEMP.

Applications: 
 2018–present Volvo XC40 badged as XC40 D4 AWDD4204T13

Single turbocharger.

Emissions level Euro 6d-TEMP.

Applications: 
 2019 Volvo V40 II badged as V40 D2 2019 Volvo V40CC badged as V40CC D2D4204T14

Twin turbochargers.

This engine is available with the M66F and AW TG-81SC gearbox.

Emissions level Euro 6 for CC models, non CC models Euro 6b for model years 2016 to 2018 and for the XC60 II, V60 II emissions level Euro 6d-TEMP.

Applications: 
 2015–2019 Volvo V40 II badged as V40 D4 2015–2019 Volvo V40CC badged as V40CC D4 2016–2018 Volvo S60 II badged as S60 D4 2016–2018 Volvo S60CC badged as S60CC D4 2016–2018 Volvo V60 badged as V60 D4 2016–2018 Volvo V60CC badged as V60CC D4 2019–present Volvo V60 II badged as V60 D4 or V60 D4 AWD 2019–present Volvo V60CC II badged as V60CC D4 AWD 2014–2017 Volvo XC60 badged as XC60 D4 2017–present Volvo XC60 II badged as XC60 D4 or XC60 D4 AWD 2016–present Volvo S90 II badged as S90 D4 or S90 D4 AWD 2016–present Volvo V90 II badged as V90 D4 or V90 D4 AWD 2016–present Volvo V90CC badged as V90CC D4 AWD 2015–present Volvo XC90 II badged as XC90 D4D4204T16

The compression ratio was changed to 16.0:1. Single turbocharger.

This engine is available with the M76 R7.0, M66F and AW TG-81SC gearbox.

The engine is equipped with a SCR system that has a 11.5 L AdBlue tank for SPA models or 14.5 L AdBlue tank for CMA models.

Emissions level Euro 6d-TEMP.

Applications: 
 2018–2019 Volvo V40CC badged as V40CC D3 2018–present Volvo XC40 badged as XC40 D3 or XC40 D3 AWD' 2019–present Volvo V60 II badged as V60 D3 2019–present Volvo S90 II badged as S90 D3D4204T20

Engine variant for cars equipped with an automatic gearbox. Single turbocharger.

Emissions level Euro 6b.

Applications: 
 2016–2018 Volvo S60 II badged as S60 D2 2016–2018 Volvo V60 badged as V60 D2 2015–2016 Volvo V70 III badged as V70 D2D4204T23

Twin turbochargers, one with VNT. Equipped with PowerPulse.

This engine is only available with the AW TG-81SC gearbox.

Starting with model year 2018 the engine is equipped with a SCR system that has a 11.5 L AdBlue tank.

Emissions level Euro 6, for model year 2018 upgraded to emissions level Euro 6d-TEMP.

Applications: 
 2018–present Volvo XC60 II badged as XC60 D5 AWD 2017–present Volvo S90 II badged as S90 D5 AWD 2017–present Volvo V90 II badged as V90 D5 AWD 2017–present Volvo V90CC badged as V90CC D5 AWD 2017–present Volvo XC90 II badged as XC90 D5 AWD''

Notes

References

Volvo engines